"You have two cows" is a political analogy and form of early 20th century American political satire to describe various economic systems of government. The setup of a typical joke of this kind is the assumption that the listener lives within a given system and has two cows, a very relatable occupation across countries and national boundaries. The punch line is what happens to the listener and the cows in the system; it offers a brief and humorous take on the subject or locale.

A newer variant of the joke cycle compares  different peoples and countries.

History

An article in The Modern Language Journal lists the following classical ones:
Socialism: If you have two cows. The government takes one and gives one to your neighbor.
Communism: If you have two cows. The government takes them both and promises you milk but you starve.
Fascism: If you have two cows. The government takes them and sells you the milk.
New Dealism:  If you have two cows, you shoot one and milk the other; then you pour the milk down the drain.
Nazism: If you have two cows, the Government shoots you and keeps the cows.
Capitalism: If you have two cows, you sell one and buy a bull.

Bill Sherk mentions that such lists circulated throughout the United States since around 1936 under the title "Parable of the Isms". A column in The Chicago Daily Tribune in 1938 attributes a version involving socialism, communism, fascism and New Dealism to an address by Silas Strawn to the Economic Club of Chicago on 29 November 1935.

Notable variants
Jokes of this genre formed the base of a monologue by American comedian Pat Paulsen on The Smothers Brothers Comedy Hour in the late 1960s. Satirising the satire, he appended this comment to capitalism: "...Then put both of them in your wife's name and declare bankruptcy." This material was later used as an element of his satirical US presidential campaign in 1968, and was included on his 1968 comedy album Pat Paulsen for President.

Richard M Steers and Luciara Nardon in their book about global economy use the "two cows" metaphor to illustrate the concept of cultural differences.

They write that jokes of the kind are considered funny because they are "realistic but exaggerated caricatures" of various cultures, and the pervasiveness of such jokes stems from the significant cultural differences. Steers and Nardon also state that others believe such jokes present cultural stereotypes and must be viewed with caution.

Enron scandal 
The economics of the Enron scandal have been a target of the "two cows" joke, often describing the accounting fraud that took place in Enron's finances. Much of the beginning of the joke when used to describe Enron resembles the following:

The ending of the joke varies in most interactions. The magazine Wired in 2008 ended the joke with Enron selling one cow to buy a new president of the United States, that no balance sheet was provided with the annual report, and ultimately the public buying Enron's bull. In 2002, Power Engineering ended the joke by announcing Enron would start trading cows online using the platform COW (cows on web).

See also
 Ethnic joke
 Ethnic stereotype
 Spherical cow

Notes

References

Fictional cattle
Political satire
Joke cycles
Metaphors referring to cattle
Political metaphors
Economic policy
1940s neologisms